Epimetasia rufoarenalis is a moth in the family Crambidae. It was first described by Rothschild in 1913. It is found in Algeria and the United Arab Emirates.

References

Moths described in 1913
Odontiini